Flip Stapper (23 November 1944 – 4 November 2021) was a Dutch professional footballer who played as a midfielder for Blauw-Wit Amsterdam, Heracles, FC Twente, AZ'67 and KFC.

References

1944 births
2021 deaths
Dutch footballers
Blauw-Wit Amsterdam players
Heracles Almelo players
FC Twente players
AZ Alkmaar players
Eerste Divisie players
Eredivisie players
Footballers from Amsterdam
Association football midfielders